The Charuplaya tree frog (Boana callipleura) is a species of frog in the family Hylidae endemic to Bolivia. Its natural habitats are subtropical or tropical moist montane forests, rivers, and canals and ditches.

References

Boana
Amphibians of Bolivia
Endemic fauna of Bolivia
Amphibians described in 1902
Taxonomy articles created by Polbot